Thalassema is a genus of spoonworms in the subclass Echiura.

Species
The World Register of Marine Species includes these species in this genus:-

 Thalassema antarcticum Stephen, 1941
 Thalassema arcassonense Cuénot, 1902
 Thalassema diaphanes Sluiter, 1889
 Thalassema elapsum Sluiter, 1912
 Thalassema fuscum Ikeda, 1904
 Thalassema hartmani Fisher, 1947
 Thalassema jenniferae Biseswar, 1988
 Thalassema liliae Schaeffer, 1972
 Thalassema malakhovi Popkov, 1992
 Thalassema marshalli Prashad, 1935
 Thalassema mortenseni Fischer, 1923
 Thalassema ochotica Pergament, 1961
 Thalassema ovatum Sluiter, 1902
 Thalassema owstoni Ikeda, 1904
 Thalassema papillosum (Delle Chiaje, 1822)
 Thalassema philostracum Fisher, 1947
 Thalassema steinbecki Fisher, 1946
 Thalassema sydniense Edmonds, 1960
 Thalassema thalassema (Pallas, 1774)
 Thalassema viride Verrill, 1879

References

Echiurans